Rudolph Johann Joseph Rainier, Archduke of Austria, Prince Royal of Hungary and Bohemia, Cardinal-Archbishop of Olomouc (8 January 1788 – 24 July 1831), was a member of the House of Habsburg-Lorraine, and an Austrian clergyman and noble. He was consecrated as Archbishop of Olomouc (Olmütz) in 1819 and became cardinal in the same year. Rudolph is known for his patronage of the arts, most notably as sponsor of Ludwig van Beethoven, who dedicated several of his works to him.

Biography 
Born in the Pitti Palace in Florence, Tuscany, he was the youngest son of Emperor Leopold II and Maria Louisa of Spain. In 1803 or 1804, Rudolph began taking lessons in piano and composition from Ludwig van Beethoven. The two became friends, and Rudolph became a supporter and patron of Beethoven; their meetings continued until 1824. Beethoven dedicated 14 compositions to Rudolph, including the Archduke Trio, the Hammerklavier Sonata, the Emperor Concerto and the Missa Solemnis. Piano Sonata No. 26 - Les Adieux ("The Farewells") was gifted to Rudolf just before his flight from Vienna with the Royal family on the occasion of the 1809 invasion by Napoleon. The movements are "Lebewohl", "Abwesenheit", and "Wiedersehen" ('farewell', 'absence', and 'reunion'). Rudolph dedicated one of his own compositions to Beethoven. The letters Beethoven wrote to Rudolph are today kept at the Gesellschaft der Musikfreunde in Vienna.

Franz Schubert and Ferdinand Ries also dedicated works to Rudolf.

On 24 March 1819, aged 31, Rudolph was appointed Archbishop of Olomouc in the present day Czech Republic but then part of the Austrian Empire. He was made Cardinal-Priest of the titular church  of S. Pietro in Montorio by Pope Pius VII on 4 June 1819. He was ordained a priest on 29 August 1819, and consecrated a bishop on 26 September.

In 1823–24, he was one of the 50 composers who composed a variation on a waltz by Anton Diabelli for Vaterländischer Künstlerverein. In Rudolph's case, the music was published anonymously, as by "S.R.D" (standing for Serenissimus Rudolfus Dux).

He died on 24 July 1831 of a cerebral hemorrhage in Baden bei Wien at the age of 43 and was interred in the Imperial Crypt in Vienna; his heart was buried in the crypt in Saint Wenceslas Cathedral in Olomouc.

Ancestors

Sources 
 Cardinal biographies
 http://www.catholic-hierarchy.org/bishop/bhabs.html

External links 

1788 births
1831 deaths
18th-century Bohemian people
19th-century Austrian cardinals
19th-century Czech people
19th-century Austrian composers
Austrian male composers
Austrian composers
Austrian expatriates in Italy
Bishops of Olomouc
Burials at Saint Wenceslas Cathedral
House of Habsburg-Lorraine
Knights of the Golden Fleece of Austria
Knights of the Order of Saint Stephen of Hungary
Nobility from Florence
Austrian princes
Clergy from Florence
19th-century male musicians
Burials at the Imperial Crypt
Sons of emperors
Cardinals created by Pope Pius VII
Children of Leopold II, Holy Roman Emperor
Austrian patrons of music
Sons of kings